Cuatro Caminos (English: Four Roads) is the fifth album by Mexican rock band Café Tacuba, released in 2003.

Background
Cuatro Caminos was produced by Gustavo Santaolalla, Dave Fridmann (The Flaming Lips, Weezer) and Andrew Weiss (Ween).

The title Cuatro Caminos references the name of a major road intersection and metro station in Mexico City. The album is marked by wordplay, as in the song titles "Hoy Es" (sounds like "Oyes", meaning "You're Listening"), "Soy o Estoy", and "Hola Adiós" (sounds like "Hola a Dios", meaning "Hello to God"). Lead singer Rubén Albarrán was credited on this album as "Élfego Buendía". This was the first Café Tacuba album to use live drums instead of drum machines.

Reception

Cuatro Caminos was featured on year-end lists of the best albums of 2003 by several publications, including Rolling Stone, The New York Times and Blender. In 2004, it won a Grammy Award for Best Latin Rock/Alternative Album and two Latin Grammy Awards for Best Alternative Album and Best Rock Song for "Eres". Music website Club Fonograma named Cuatro Caminos the best album of the decade.

The song "Eo" appears in the soundtrack to the soccer video game FIFA Football 2004.

Track listing

Personnel
 Elfego Buendía (Rubén Albarrán) – vocals, guitar
 Emmanuel del Real – keyboards, acoustic guitar, piano, programming, vocals, melodeon
 Joselo Rangel – electric guitar, acoustic guitar, vocals
 Quique Rangel – bass guitar, electric upright bass, vocals

Guest Musicians
 Victor Indrizzo - drums (tracks 1, 2, 4, 6, 9, 12, 13)
 Joey Waronker - drums (tracks 3, 5, 7, 8, 10, 11) 
 Alejandro Flores - acoustic guitar, violin (track 13), jarana (track 4)
 Dave Fridmann - ensemble (track 14)

Certifications

References

Café Tacuba albums
2003 albums
Latin Grammy Award for Best Alternative Music Album
Grammy Award for Best Latin Rock, Urban or Alternative Album
Albums produced by Gustavo Santaolalla